Pokrovka is a rural locality (a selo) in Bayevsky District, Altai Krai, Russia. The population was 226 as of 2013. There are 3 streets.

Geography 
Pokrovka is located near the Kulunda River 29 km southwest of Bayevo (the district's administrative centre) by road. Rybnye Borki is the nearest rural locality.

References 

Rural localities in Bayevsky District